Inga marginata is a species of plant in the family Fabaceae.

It is native to Bolivia, Brazil,  and Argentina. It is found in the Atlantic Forest ecoregion.

References

External links

marginata
Flora of Argentina
Flora of Bolivia
Flora of Brazil
Flora of the Atlantic Forest
Taxa named by Carl Ludwig Willdenow